Walking Off the Buzz is the third studio album by the American alternative rock band Blessid Union of Souls, released on April 27, 1999 (see 1999 in music) on V2 Records. It spawned the hit single "Hey Leonardo (She Likes Me for Me)".

Track listing

References

External links
 Website info

1999 albums
Blessid Union of Souls albums
V2 Records albums